The Lucar was an English automobile manufactured in Brixton, London, from 1913 until 1914. it featured a 4-cylinder, 9hp/1093cc Aster engine and electric lamps. It was manufactured by Lucar London, Limited.

See also
 List of car manufacturers of the United Kingdom

References

Defunct motor vehicle manufacturers of England
Motor vehicle manufacturers based in London